The 1982–83 UC Irvine Anteaters men's basketball team represented the University of California, Irvine during the 1982–83 NCAA Division I men's basketball season. The Anteaters were led by third year head coach Bill Mulligan and played their home games at the Crawford Hall. They were members of the Pacific Coast Athletic Association. They finished the season 16–12 and 8–8 in PCAA play.

Previous season 
Led by All-American Kevin Magee, the 1981–82 Anteaters won a then program record 23 wins and finished 2nd in conference play, their best finish in program history.

Off-season

Incoming transfers

Source:

1981 recruiting class

Source:

Roster

Schedule

|-
!colspan=9 style=|Regular Season

|-
!colspan=9 style=| PCAA Conference tournament

Source

Awards and honors
Ben McDonald
PCAA First Team All-Conference
Tod Murphy
PCAA All-Freshman Team
Source: 
Source

References

UC Irvine Anteaters men's basketball seasons
UC Irvine
UC Irvine Anteaters
UC Irvine Anteaters